Rodney Lamont Wright Jr.  (born December 28, 1999), better known by his stage name Big30 (stylized as BIG30), is an American rapper known for his feature on his childhood friend Pooh Shiesty's 2021 single "Neighbors", which peaked at number 51 on the Billboard Hot 100. Big30 released his debut mixtape, King of Killbranch, in September 2021. It includes appearances from Future, Lil Durk, Pooh Shiesty, and Moneybagg Yo, among others.

Controversies

Feuds 
In June 2020, rapper Gucci Mane called out Wright for allegedly posting him on his Instagram account multiple times, claiming that they only met once. Wright did not respond. The beef was squashed shortly thereafter, with Wright appearing on Gucci Mane's 2021 single, "Shit Crazy".

Legal issues 
In October 2020, Wright was arrested in Birmingham, Alabama, along with the driver, who was identified as Leaton Foster of Decatur, Georgia. The two were traveling from Memphis, Tennessee to Atlanta, Georgia with more than $17,000 in cash, a loaded handgun, promethazine, codeine, and packaged cannabis. Wright was charged with first-degree possession of marijuana, possession of drug paraphernalia, and being a felon in possession of firearm, along with other federal charges.

Discography

Studio albums

Mixtapes

Singles

As lead artist

As featured artist

Other charted songs

Guest appearances

Notes

References 

1999 births
21st-century American rappers
American hip hop singers
Rappers from Memphis, Tennessee
American male rappers
American male songwriters
Living people
African-American male rappers
African-American songwriters
21st-century American male musicians
21st-century African-American musicians